Helophilus groenlandicus is a European hoverfly.

Distribution
It is found on the northern Holarctic, the Baltic countries, the northern Russia, Siberia, Greenland and North America. In Great Britain it is only rarely found in Scotland.

References

Diptera of Europe
Eristalinae
Insects described in 1780
Taxa named by Johan Christian Fabricius
Hoverflies of North America